Dumka, the headquarters of the Dumka district and Santhal Pargana region, is a city in the state of Jharkhand, India. It was made the headquarters of the Santhal Pargana region, which was carved out of the Bhagalpur and Birbhum district after the Santal Hool of 1855. Dumka was carved out of the southern part of Bihar along with 18 other Districts on 15 November 2000 to form Jharkhand as 28th State of India. Dumka is a peaceful and green city and also sub-capital of Jharkhand. The nearest important cities are Rampurhat and Deoghar.

Etymology 
There are two theories on how Dumka got its name. The first one suggests that Dumka's name derives from the Santali word sumk for "shunted" or "small," because during the British Raj, it was a small town compared to Rampurhat and Bhagalpur .

The other is that Dumka derives its name from the Persian word damin-i-koh, which means 'skirts (an edge, border or extreme part) of the hills'.

History

Early history 
The earlier inhabitants of the present-day district of whom there is some record, it appears, were the Paharias (for example, the Maler and Sauria Paharias). The Greek traveler Megasthenes identified these people as Mallis. He referred to the Sauria Paharias as savars of Odisha. Medieval History: Due to inaccessibility of the area caused by the cliffs of the Rajmahal Hills, it was a place of strategic economic importance, with a fort at Teliagarhi. After the 1539 victory of Sher Shah Suri at Chousa, the area fell into the hands of the Afghans, but it was soon lost to the Mughals under Akbar when Hussain Quli Khan was made viceroy of Bengal.

British Raj 
The English representative, Dr. Gabriel Bokgliton, procured a farman from Shah Jahan. Between 1742 and 1751 the area of Dumka close to Rajmahal witnessed frequent inroads by the Marathas under Raghoji Bhosle and Peshwa Balaji Rao. On 1745 Raghoji Bhosle entered Rajmahal via the hills and jungles of Santal Pargana. The early stay of the English was spent in subduing the Paharias. In 1769 Dumka remained a Ghatwali police post under Birbhum District of Bengal. On 1775 Dumka was transferred to Bhagalpur Division. In 1865 Dumka was made an independent district after being carved out of Bhagalpur. On 1872 Dumka was made headquarters of the whole district of Santal Pargana. In 1889 Paul Olaf Bodding started his service in India (Dumka/Benagaria) after Lars Olsen Skrefsrud, and Bodding created the first alphabet for the Santhals. The NELC-church was created as a Lutheran Church in this area - before the Catholics had established a mission in this area at all. On 1902 The first municipality was established. FInally in 1920 Motor cars and buses were introduced.

Post Independence 
Firstly on 1952 The Apostolic Prefecture of Malda was erected. In 1962, it was promoted to the Roman Catholic Diocese of Dumka. Then in 1983 Dumka was made the divisional headquarters of Santhal Pargana. On 15 November 2000 Dumka became the sub-capital of Jharkhand. In 2011 Dumka is connected with the newly built Jasidih-Dumka railway line. On 2012 Intercity express to Ranchi started via Jasidih. Later in 2017 Jharkhand opens pilot training center in Dumka. Finally on 2018 Four-lane road from Dudhani to Tata Showroom constructed.

Geography 

It has an average elevation of 137 metres (449 feet).

Demographics 

 India census, Dumka is a Nagar Parishad city in district of Dumka, Jharkhand. The Dumka city is divided into 23 wards for which elections are held every five years. The Dumka Nagar Parishad has population of 47,584 of which 25,364 are males while 22,220 are females as per report released by Census India 2011.

Population of children with age of 0-6 is 5371 which is 11.29% of total population of Dumka (Nagar Parishad). In Dumka Nagar Parishad, Female Sex Ratio is of 876 against state average of 948. Moreover, Child Sex Ratio in Dumka is around 891 compared to Jharkhand state average of 948. Literacy rate of Dumka city is 89.92% higher than state average of 66.41%. In Dumka, Male literacy is around 93.46% while female literacy rate is 85.87%.

Religion and Languages 
 The Catholic minority is served by its own Roman Catholic Diocese of Dumka. Besides the official language Hindi, Urdu, Santali and Bengali are important. Here the major religions are:

 Hinduism
 Islam
 Christianity
 Jainism

Climate
Dumka has a humid subtropical climate (Köppen climate classification Cwa), with warm, wet summers and mild winters.

Economy

Shopping Malls
There are six Shopping Malls in Dumka.
 V-Mart: This is the first mall to be opened in Dumka and this is situated near Veer Kuwar Singh Chowk, Dumka.
 M-Baazar:  This is situated below Hotel Suvidha, near Marwari Chowk.
 1-India Family Mart:  This is situated in Thana Road, Dumka.
 Bazaar India: This is situated in Bhagalpur Road, Dumka just beside Punjab National Bank.
 V2:  This is situated just opposite to 1-India Family Mart in Thana road, Dumka.
 Reliance Trends: This is a mall in Dumka district which was opened on 5 August 2019. This is situated in Jail Road, Dumka, opposite to Mary filling station.
Reliance Smart store near Gandhi maidan
Virat superstore near genda talkie

Culture 
Dumka District contains many Hindu temples, such as Basukinath, Sirshanath, Maluti Mandir, Shiv Pahar and Dharamsthana. Crowds visit these places during the month of Sawan.
Hizla Mela (Fair) is organized every year in Hizla and continues for a week. It is a fair of great cultural importance, thousands of people visit during the fair.

Politics 
The first Chief Minister of Jharkhand, Babulal Marandi, hailed from Dumka constituency. In 2000, when Jharkhand was carved out of Bihar, NDA came to power in Jharkhand with Marandi as the Chief Minister.

Shibu Soren is another politician associated with Dumka. He also has a temporary residence in Dumka.

In 2014, state election BJP coalition got majority in Assembly and Raghubar Das become the Chief Minister of Jharkhand, another politician associated with Jamsedhpur.

Education 
There are various Higher Secondary schools in Dumka: 
 St. Teresa Girls School
Sido Kanhu High School
 +2 Zila School
 National School
 Govt. Girls School
 Dumka Central School

Some reputed schools which provide secondary level education are:
 North Valley International School, 
 St. Joseph's High School
 Bal Bharti School

Other schools include Ananda Marg School (Kurwa), Modern Sainik School, Green Mount Academy and New Life Academy at Kathikund.

For higher education Dumka offers many colleges e.g.- Sido Kanhu Murmu University was established in 1992 at Dumka and covers whole Santhal Pargana. Many colleges are affiliated or constituent to SKMU in the division.

St. Xavier's College, Dumka offers various courses. Others include Santhal Pargana College (S.P. college), A.N. College, and S.P. Mahila College, which offer undergraduate, graduate and post-graduate courses.

Phulo-Jhano Murmu College of Dairy Technology at Hansdiha, Dumka is Jharkhand's first Dairy Technology college established in 2019. It is affiliated by Birsa Agricultural University, Ranchi.

GTRTC, Dumka (Government Tool Room and Training Centre) was established in 2007 by the Department of Industries, Government of Jharkahnd with the assistance of Ministry of MSME, Government of India. It offers various training programmes to meet need for technical manpower required in the manufacturing sector. Lahanti Institute of Multiple Skills was established by Evangelical Social Action Forum to provide skills training to unemployed youth in the remote regions of Santhal Pargana. Dumka also have a Govt. Polytechnic College, a Govt. Women's Polytechnic College and also a govt. ITI for technical education.

Dumka Engineering College was established as an institution under PPP model between the Government of Jharkhand and Techno India Group.

Phulo Jhano Murmu Medical College and Hospital was established in 2019 and it also contains hospitals for serving population of Dumka.

Tourist places 
 Basukinath

Temples 
 Maluti temple Village - Maluti is an ancient temple village of Dumka District under Shikaripara police station. It is near the border of West Bengal and Jharkhand State. There are many Shiva, Bishnu, Durga Terracotta temples.

Tourist spots 

Masanjore is a picnic spot situated 30 km to Dumka. This small village is about 30 km south of Dumka. The Masanjore dam on the Mayurakshi River is a tourist draw. From the counterpart rupee fund created through supplies of wheat and other materials from Canada for use in India, Canada Govt. devoted those funds to further development of the Mayurakshi project and Massanjore Dam was commissioned in 1955. The Dam is still mentioned as Canada Dam. The dam is bounded by hills and forests. Mayurakshi Bhawan Bungalow and Inspection Bungalow, offer accommodation within the village. By road, Masanjore is connected with Vakreshwara (59 km), Sainthia (50 km), Tarapith (70 km), Rampurhat (62 km) and Deoghar (98 km).

Chutonath - It is situated 20 km from the district headquarters. Chutonath is a religious place of Hindu god Lord Chutonath. This festival is celebrated mainly in the month of April. This area has become a tourist attraction.
 Dharmasthan - It is temple situated in Tin bazaar at the heart of Dumka Town, it is known for the Goddess Kali, during the Durga puja 7 days special puja is organised here.

Natural places 
 Kurwa park (Shrishti Pahar) - It is a small picnic spot about 5 km to the east of Dumka. It has a park, facilities for boating and a small hill. A temple is also situated here.

Transport

Rail

In July 2011, Dumka was connected to Jasidih with the newly built Jasidih - Dumka railway line. Since then, the city has seen a growing number of three-wheelers on the road. in June 2015, Dumka Rampurhat Train service is also started.

Road
Dumka is connected by road to the neighboring cities such as Deoghar, Bhagalpur, Dhanbad, Rampurhat. Buses are the preferred mode of transport and are run by both government agencies and private operators. Dumka has good connectivity to neighboring districts with buses. There is a luxury night bus service between Dumka - Ranchi and Kolkata.

Air 
Nearby airports are:

Deoghar Airport
 Kazi Nazrul airport , Durgapur
 Birsa Munda Airport, Ranchi
 Jay Prakash Narayan Airport, Patna
 Netaji Subhas Chandra Bose International Airport, Kolkata

References

Further reading
Verma, K. K., Alvi, N. M., Lal, B. B., & India. (1981). Special survey reports on selected towns: Series 4. Delhi: Controller of Publications.

External links 
 Official Site
 Tourist Places in Dumka
 Santal-Tribes of Dumka
 Media coverage of Engg college in Dumka.
 Tools Room and Training Centre(GTRTC) Dumka

Cities and towns in Anga Desh
Cities and towns in Dumka district